David Černý (born 15 December 1967) is a Czech sculptor. His works can be mainly seen in many locations in Prague.

Early life

Černý was born in Prague, Czechoslovakia. From 1988 to 1994 he studied at the Kurt Gebauer Studio at the Academy of Arts, Architecture and Design in Prague and in 1995 and 1996 he participated in the Whitney Museum Independent Study Program, New York, US. In 1994-1995 he took the PSI artists residence, New York, US and in 1996 he received the Pollock Krasner Foundation Grant. In 1991 he took a Residency of the Swiss Government in Boswil, Switzerland

Career
He gained notoriety in 1991 by painting a Soviet tank pink, to serve as a war memorial in central Prague. As the Monument to Soviet Tank Crews was a national cultural monument at that time, his act of civil disobedience was considered vandalism and he was briefly arrested. Another of Černý's conspicuous contributions to Prague is "Tower Babies" (2000), a series of cast figures of crawling infants attached to Žižkov Television Tower.

In 2005, Černý created Shark, an image of Saddam Hussein in a tank of formaldehyde.  The work was presented at the second Prague Biennale that same year. The work is a direct parody of a 1991 work by Damien Hirst, The Physical Impossibility of Death in the Mind of Someone Living.  In 2006, the work was banned in Middelkerke, Belgium, in Bielsko-Biała, Poland, and also in the German town of Büdelsdorf.
 With respect to the Belgian situation, the mayor of that town, Michel Landuyt, admitted that he was worried that the exhibit could "shock people, including Muslims" in a year already marred by tensions associated with Danish cartoons depicting the prophet Mohammed.

The Deputy Mayor of Bielsko-Biała, Zbigniew Michniowski, contacted the city-funded gallery, galeria BWA on 9 September 2006 and threatened dire consequences if the artwork were not removed promptly. In response, Shark was transported to the Szara gallery, in the nearby town of Cieszyn. The mayor of Cieszyn, Bogdan Ficek, distanced himself from Bielsko-Biała City Hall's values. "I can not see any reason a politician should censor art," Ficek said.

His statue METALmorphosis is on display in Charlotte, North Carolina. Černý created a similar outdoor sculpture in 2014 in Prague, called Head of Franz Kafka.

His Entropa, created to mark the Czech presidency of the European Union Council during the first half of 2009, attracted controversy both for its stereotyped depictions of the various EU member states, and because it turned out to have been created by Černý and two friends rather than, as promised, being a collaboration between artists from each of the member states. Some EU member states reacted negatively to the depiction of their country. For instance, Bulgaria decided to summon the Czech Ambassador to Sofia in order to discuss the illustration of the Balkan country as a collection of squat toilets. Meanwhile, the Bulgarian permanent representative to the EU allegedly said "It is a humiliation for the Bulgarian nation and an offense to our national dignity.”

For 2012 Summer Olympics Černý created "London Booster" – a double decker bus with mechanical arms for doing push-ups.

Awards
In 2000, Černý won the Jindřich Chalupecký Award.

Gallery

See also
 Angela Singer
 Chris Savido
 Cosimo Cavallaro

References

External links

 Official site of David Černý
 Public art of David Černý - flickr set of photographs
 Czech Hooliganism of David Černý 

1967 births
Living people
20th-century Czech sculptors
20th-century male artists
21st-century Czech sculptors
Artists from Prague
Czech male sculptors
Jewish artists
Czech Jews
Academy of Arts, Architecture and Design in Prague alumni